"Closing Time" is a song by American rock band Semisonic. It was released on March 10, 1998, as the lead single from their second studio album, Feeling Strangely Fine, and began to receive mainstream radio airplay on April 27, 1998. The ballad was written by Dan Wilson and produced by Nick Launay. 

The single reached number one on the US Billboard Modern Rock Tracks chart and the top 50 in Australia, Ireland, New Zealand and the United Kingdom. It is certified gold in the latter country and was nominated for the Grammy Award for Best Rock Song in 1999. The song reappeared on the charts of three countries in 2011 after being featured in the 2011 movie Friends with Benefits and an episode of the television sitcom The Office; it attained its highest chart peaks in Australia and Ireland during this period.

While the song is about people leaving a bar at closing time (also called last call), and widely interpreted as such, drummer Jacob Slichter has also indicated that the song was written by Wilson "in anticipation of fatherhood" and that it is about "being sent forth from the womb as if by a bouncer clearing out a bar".

Background and writing
Prior to the composition "Closing Time", Semisonic would usually end their concerts with the song "If I Run". The band grew tired of playing this song every night and so Wilson set out to write a new song that they could play at the end of their set. Wilson's girlfriend was pregnant at the time and although Wilson did not set out consciously to write a song about giving birth, he has stated that "Part way into the writing of the song, I realized it was also about being born."

The song ends with a quote attributed to Roman Stoic philosopher Seneca: "Every new beginning comes from some other beginning's end."

Music video
The music video was directed by Chris Applebaum. It features two continuous shots, running side by side on the screen. One side shows the band playing the song in a rehearsal space. The other side features a woman (played by Denise Franco) as the singer Dan Wilson's girlfriend. As the video progresses, Dan and his girlfriend switch sides of screen, as they attempt to meet up. At the end of the video, they both wind up at the same nightclub. However, they still end up missing each other by mere seconds and never meet. The "trick" of the video is that each shot was done as one long, continuous shot, with no cuts or editing, and therefore relies on proper timing to get the two sides of the video lined up properly.

Critical reception
Billboard magazine described "Closing Time" as an "instantly memorable rock ditty", saying, "...the core of 'Closing Time' is pure pop with a sticky chorus that will have you singing along before the end of your first listen. This could be the jam that establishes Semisonic as the top 40 heroes they deserve to be." Doug Reece of the same magazine called the song "impossibly hooky". "Closing Time" was placed at number 19 on Rolling Stones 2007 list of the "20 Most Annoying Songs".

Jacob Slichter, the drummer for Semisonic, said in 2006 that payola was how they turned "Closing Time" into a hit. Slichter stated: "It cost something close to $700,000 to $800,000 to get 'Closing Time' on the air."

Usage in other media
This song is frequently used by some radio stations as their last song before changing formats, mostly alternative rock stations. Most notably on November 16, 2016, Fort Worth and Dallas, Texas-based alternative station KDGE (102.1 FM) played a continuous loop of "Closing Time" while redirecting its listeners to its area sister mainstream rock station KEGL (97.1 FM). This continued until 5 p.m. on November 17, 2016 when the station flipped to Christmas music then full-time to a mainstream adult contemporary format on December 26.

Track listings

Australian CD single
 "Closing Time" (Bob Clearmountain mix) – 3:50
 "F.N.T." (Tom Lord-Alge mix) – 3:29
 "Made to Last" – 5:03
 "Closing Time" – 4:34

European CD single
 "Closing Time" (radio edit) – 3:49
 "Delicious" – 3:58

European maxi-CD single
 "Closing Time" (Clearmountain mix) – 3:49
 "Delicious" – 3:58
 "Gone to the Movies" – 3:52
 "Closing Time" (album version) – 4:35

UK CD1
 "Closing Time" (remix edit) – 3:49
 "Falling" (live) – 3:31
 "Long Way from Home" – 5:20

UK CD2
 "Closing Time" (album edit) – 3:52
 "F.N.T." (live acoustic) – 3:16
 "Air That I Breathe" – 4:21
 "Closing Time" (video)

UK cassette single
A. "Closing Time" (remix edit) – 3:49
B. "Air That I Breathe" – 4:21

Credits and personnel
Credits are lifted from the Feeling Strangely Fine liner notes.

Studios
 Recorded and produced at Seedy Underbelly (Minneapolis, Minnesota)
 Mixed at Ocean Way Recording (Los Angeles)
 Mastered at Gateway Mastering (Portland, Maine, US)

Personnel

 Dan Wilson – writing, piano
 John Munson – Moog
 Nick Launay – production, recording
 Brad Kern – additional recording
 Alex Oana – assistant recording engineer
 Richard Werbowenko – assistant recording engineer
 Shane Washington – assistant recording engineer
 Jack Joseph Puig – mixing
 Jim Champagne – assistant mixing engineer
 Bob Ludwig – mastering

Charts and certifications

Weekly charts

Year-end charts

Certifications

Release history

See also
 Number one modern rock hits of 1998

References

External links
 "Closing Time" on Song Exploder

1990s ballads
1998 singles
1998 songs
MCA Records singles
Music videos directed by Chris Applebaum
Semisonic songs
Song recordings produced by Nick Launay
Songs about alcohol
Songs written by Dan Wilson (musician)
Alternative rock ballads